Hyperglycinemia may refer to one of two related inborn amino acid disorders that are characterized by elevated levels of glycine in the blood.

 Propionic acidemia, also known as "ketotic glycinemia"
 Glycine encephalopathy, also known as "non-ketotic hyperglycinemia"

Amino acid metabolism disorders